Ida-Marie Moesgaard Dahl (born 19 March 1998) is a Danish handball player who plays as a pivot for Viborg HK in the Danish top division Damehåndboldligaen and the Danish national team.

She made her debut on the Danish national team on 28 September 2018, against Norway.

She also represented Denmark in the 2015 European Women's U-17 Handball Championship in Macedonia, leading to the trophy.

Achievements 
Youth World Championship:
Silver Medalist: 2016
European Youth Championship:
Winner: 2015
Junior European Championship:
Silver Medalist: 2017

References 
 

Danish female handball players
1998 births
Living people
Handball players from Copenhagen